An Individual rights advocate is an advocate "to protect the legal and human rights of individuals with disabilities." United States law provides for advocates to protect the legal rights of persons with disabilities. This advocacy can be life-changing:

There are some writers who feel that, "only individuals have rights," rather than groups.

See also
ADA Compliance Kit
American Disability rights movement
Accessibility
Developmental disability
List of disability rights activists
List of anti-discrimination acts
Disability discrimination act
 Paralegal
 Victimology

References

Disability rights
Civil liberties in the United States